The Buller River is a river in the Mid West region of Western Australia, near Geraldton.

The river is a short coastal stream of around 10 km length just to the north of Geraldton, in the Drummond Cove and Oakajee areas.

History
The Buller River was named on 7 April 1839 by the explorer George Grey while on his second disastrous expedition along the Western Australian coast, probably after Charles Buller M.P., an associate of Edward Gibbon Wakefield and Grey's friend William Hutt (brother of the 2nd Governor of Western Australia, John Hutt), and an active parliamentary proponent of the free colonization of South Australia, Western Australia and New Zealand.

References

Rivers of the Mid West region